Dorothea Sibylle of Brandenburg (German: Dorothea Sibylle von Brandenburg, 19 October 1590 — 9 March 1625) was a Duchess of Brieg by marriage. She was a daughter of John George, Elector of Brandenburg by his third wife, Elisabeth of Anhalt-Zerbst.

Life 
Born in Berlin, Dorothea Sibylle was the fourth and youngest daughter of her parents. After her father died in 1598, she grew up in her mother's estate, Crossen (in today Poland).

On 12 December 1610, Dorothea Sibylle married her maternal cousin, Duke John Christian of Brieg. She was described as "kind, and religious". She also played a crucial role in her husband's conversion to Calvinism in 1613.

Issue 
Dorothea Sibylle and John Christian had the following children:
George III (b. 4 September 1611 - d. 4 July 1664)
Joachim (b. 20 December 1612 - d. 9 February 1613)
Henry (b. 3 February 1614 - d. 4 February 1614)
Ernest (b. 3 February 1614 - d. 4 February 1614)
Anna Elisabeth (b. 23 March 1615 - d. 28 March 1616)
Louis IV (b. 19 April 1616 - d. 24 November 1663)
Rudolf (b. 6 April 1617 - d. 8 February 1633)
Christian (b. 9 April 1618 - d. 28 February 1672)
August (b. 18 March 1619 - 12 March 1620)
Sibylle Margareta (b. 20 June 1620 - d. 26 June 1657)
Dorothea (b. 16 August 1622 - d. 26 August 1622)
Agnes (b. 16 August 1622 - d. 3 September 1622)
Sophia Magdalena (b. 14 June 1624 - d. 28 April 1660)

Literature 
 Karl Adolf Menzel: Neuere Geschichte der Deutschen seit der Reformation. Band 3, Grass, Barth, 1854, S. 319 ff.
 Ernst Daniel Martin Kirchner: Die Churfürstinnen und Königinnen auf dem Throne der Hohenzollern. Band 2, Wiegandt & Grieben, 1867, S. 63 ff.
 Karl August Schmidt: Denkwürdigkeiten aus dem Leben der Herzogin Dorothea Sibylla von Liegnitz und Brieg gebornen Markgräfin von Brandenburg. Brieg 1838.
 Heinrich Wuttke: Ueber die Haus- und Tagebücher Valentin Gierth’s und die Herzogin Dorothea Sibylla von Liegnitz und Brieg, geborne Markgräfin von Brandenburg. Eine Untersuchung. Breslau 1838 (books.google.de).

References 

Dukes of Brzeg
Daughters of monarchs
1590 births

1625 deaths